Darel is a given name. Notable people with the name include:
Darel Carrier (born 1940), former professional basketball player
Darel Dieringer (1926–1989), former NASCAR Grand National and Winston Cup driver
Darel Hancock, better known as Bomani Armah, American hip-hop poet
Darel Hart (born 1964), former Australian rules footballer
Darel McKinney, early 20th-century US marine
Darel Russell (born 1980), English footballer, currently playing for Norwich City
Dominique Darel (1950–1978), French model and actress, mainly active in Italian cinema
Florence Darel (born 1968), French actress
 (born 1944), French actress

See also
 Darrel
 Darrell
 Darryl